The Imperial Garage, located in downtown Portland, Oregon, is listed on the National Register of Historic Places.

See also
 National Register of Historic Places listings in Southwest Portland, Oregon

References

External links
 

1923 establishments in Oregon
Buildings and structures completed in 1923
Garages (parking) on the National Register of Historic Places
Modern Movement architecture in the United States
National Register of Historic Places in Portland, Oregon
Portland Historic Landmarks
Southwest Portland, Oregon
Transportation buildings and structures on the National Register of Historic Places in Oregon
Transportation buildings and structures in Portland, Oregon